The 1966 Oklahoma Sooners football team represented the University of Oklahoma during the 1966 NCAA University Division football season. Led by first-year head coach Jim Mackenzie, they played their home games at Oklahoma Memorial Stadium and competed as members of the Big Eight Conference.
 
A longtime assistant at Arkansas, Mackenzie was hired in December 1965.

Following one of the worst seasons in program history, the Sooners improved to 6–4, defeated rival Texas for the first time in nine years, and upset undefeated rival Nebraska on Thanksgiving, Mackenzie was named the Coach of the Year in the Big Eight.

Schedule

Game summaries

Oregon

Iowa State

Texas

Kansas

Notre Dame

Colorado

Kansas State

Missouri

Nebraska

Oklahoma State

Rankings

Postseason

NFL/AFL draft
The following players were drafted into the National Football League or American Football League following the season.

References

Oklahoma
Oklahoma Sooners football seasons
Oklahoma Sooners football